Valeriy Yaremchenko (born 15 August 1947) is a Ukrainian football manager and former player.

Career
He was born in the city of Kryvyi Rih, Ukraine. As a player, he participated in 247 games as a member of Shakhtar scoring 24 goals. He coached Syria (1985–87), Shakhtar (1989–94, 2001–03), Kremin (1994), Kolos (1995), Rotor (2004), Metalurh Z (2004–05). Honorary coach of Ukraine in 1993.

Statistics for Shakhtar

Honours

Player
 Soviet Top League 
 Runner-Up: 1975
 Bronze: 1978
 Soviet Cup 
 Runner-Up: 1978

Manager
 Ukrainian Premier League 
 Runner-up: 1993–94, 1996–97, 1997–98, 2002–03
 Ukrainian Cup 
 Winner: 1996–97

External links
 Profile at KLISF 
 Profile at UkrSoccerHistory 
 Profile at FC Shakhtar Donetsk 

1947 births
Living people
Sportspeople from Kryvyi Rih
Soviet footballers
Ukrainian footballers
Association football defenders
FC Kryvbas Kryvyi Rih players
FC Shakhtar Donetsk players
Soviet Top League players
Ukrainian football managers
Soviet football managers
FC Shakhtar Donetsk non-playing staff
Syria national football team managers
FC Shakhtar Donetsk managers
FC Kremin Kremenchuk managers
FC Rotor Volgograd managers
FC Metalurh Zaporizhzhia managers
FC Karpaty Lviv managers
FC Mariupol managers
Soviet Top League managers
Ukrainian Premier League managers
Russian Premier League managers
Ukrainian expatriate football managers
Soviet expatriate football managers
Ukrainian expatriate sportspeople in Russia
Soviet expatriate sportspeople in Syria
Expatriate football managers in Russia
Expatriate football managers in Syria